The following lists events that happened in 1931 in Iceland.

Incumbents
Monarch - Kristján X
Prime Minister – Tryggvi Þórhallsson

Events

Births

1 March – Sveinn Teitsson, footballer (d. 2017)
13 April – Halldór Halldórsson, footballer (d. 2003)
5 June – Pétur Georgsson, footballer
2 July – Oddur Pétursson, cross country skier. (d. 2018)
6 August – Matthías Árni Mathiesen, politician (d. 2011).
27 August – Ebenezer Thorarinsson, cross country skier (d. 2003).
10 September – Magnús Jónsson, footballer
4 October – Jón Helgason, politician. (d. 2019)
25 October – Hörður Felixson, footballer
3 November – Erlendur Haraldsson, psychologist (d. 2020)
14 December – Hannes Pétursson, poet

Full date missing
Jón Gunnar Árnason, sculptor (d. 1989)

Deaths

References

 
1930s in Iceland
Iceland
Iceland
Years of the 20th century in Iceland